Woman at War (Kona fer í stríð, literary Woman goes to battle) is a 2018 Icelandic-Ukrainian comedy-drama film written, produced and directed by Benedikt Erlingsson, and starring Halldóra Geirharðsdóttir.

Following a premiere at 2018 Cannes Film Festival via the International Critics' Week, it was released on 22 May 2018 to critical acclaim and selected as the Icelandic entry for the Best Foreign Language Film at the 91st Academy Awards ceremony, but it was not nominated.

Premise
Halla, a choir conductor and eco-activist, plans to disrupt the operations of a Rio Tinto aluminium plant in the Icelandic highlands, purposely damaging electricity pylons and wires to cut their power supply.

One day, a long-forgotten application to adopt an orphan child from Ukraine is approved. At the same time, the government ramps up police and propaganda efforts in order to catch and discredit her. The film revolves around her attempts to reconcile her dangerous and illegal activism with the upcoming adoption. All the while, the film's soundtrack players, consisting of a three-man band and Ukrainian traditional singers, interacts with the plot and characters.

Cast

Halldóra Geirharðsdóttir as Halla / Ása
Jörundur Ragnarsson as Baldvin
Jóhann Sigurðarson as Sveinbjörn
Juan Camilo Román Estrada as Juan 
Vala Kristin Eiriksdottir as Stefania
Haraldur Stefansson as Gylfi Blöndal
Jon Johanson as The Farmer 
Jón Gnarr as President of the Republic of Iceland
Þórhildur Ingunn as Sírry
Margaryta Hilska as Nika
Hilmir Snær Guðnason as Taxi-guy

Galyna Goncharenko, Susanna Karpenko & Iryna Danyleiko plays the trio of Ukrainian singers. The band is played by Magnús Trygvason Eliassen (drummer), Omar Gudjonsson (sousaphonist) and Davíð Þór Jónsson (accordion & pianist).

Accolades
Woman at War was shown at the 2018 Cannes Film Festival, in the International Critics' Week section, where the screenwriters won the SACD award. The film won the Nordic Council Film Prize and the Lux prize award of the European Parliament for 2018.

It also was voted the audience award at the Tromsø International Film Festival in Norway in January 2019.

Reception
Peter Bradshaw, for The Guardian, praised Halldóra Geirharðsdóttir's 'attractive and sympathetic performance' as Halla, and called the  film a 'well-turned, well-tuned oddity' that was 'confidently and rather stylishly made'.

Jay Weissberg, for Variety, called the film 'a delightful follow-up to  Of Horses and Men', and praised the director for 'arranging beautifully shot picaresque episodes around a central figure who lives the ideals of the heroes she has hanging on her wall, Mahatma Gandhi and Nelson Mandela'.

Remake
On 11 December 2018, it was announced that Jodie Foster was to direct and star in an English remake.

See also
 List of submissions to the 91st Academy Awards for Best Foreign Language Film
 List of Icelandic submissions for the Academy Award for Best Foreign Language Film

References

External links
 

2018 comedy-drama films
2018 films
Eco-terrorism in fiction
French comedy-drama films
Icelandic comedy-drama films
Ukrainian comedy-drama films
War in Donbas films
Films directed by Benedikt Erlingsson
2010s French films